Philip Augustine, an Indian gastroenterologist, specialist in gastrointestinal endoscopy and a hospital administrator from Ernakulam, Kerala. He founded the Lakeshore Hospital and Research Centre in 2003, one of the largest multispeciality hospitals in south India. In 2010, the Government of India honoured him with the Padma Shri, for his services to the fields of medicine.

Biography

Philip Augustine was born in Kaduthuruthy, a small hamlet in Kerala. Choosing medical profession, he secured his MD from the All India Institute of Medical Sciences, in 1975, with a Gold Medal.

Augustine started his professional career at a small clinic in the town of Koothattukulam. Later, he specialised in Gastroenterology and had advanced training in ultrasonography and endoscopy at various centres across the globe such as Wisconsin Medical College, Milwaukee, USA, Eppendorf University, Hamburg, Germany, Hospital Beuton, Paris and University of Marseilles, France, Bern University in Switzerland and ULM University, Munich, Germany. His career took a turn when he joined Devamatha Hospital, Koothattukulam where he established a speciality gastroenterology department which now serves as a referral centre in Kerala. Later, he moved to PVS Memorial Hospital in Ernakulam to address a wider canvass of patients.

In 1996, Augustine joined hands with a group of doctors and launched the work on the Lakeshore Hospital and Research Centre. The hospital was opened to public in 2003.

Augustine is married, has four children and presently lives in Palarivattom, Kochi, Kerala.

Legacy

The primary contribution of Augustine is the hospital he found in 1996, along with a bunch of doctors and businessmen, the Lakshore Hospital and Research Centre, which became operational in 2003. The hospital, has, over the years, grown to become one of the leading multi speciality health care centres in Kerala and is stated to have several firsts to its credit. The hospital is certified by the National Accreditation Board for Hospitals and Healthcare providers.
 First living donor liver transplant in Kerala
 First insulin pump insertion surgery in South India
 First metal on ceramic knee replacement surgery in Asia
 First Spyglass Cholangioscopy and pancreatoscopy in Kerala
 First to introduce double balloon enteroscopy in Kerala
 First to introduce wireless capsule endoscopy in Kerala
 First peripheral stem cell transplantation in Kerala
 Third centre in the world to perform key hole surgical transplantation of kidney

Besides, Augustine is credited as the first to report on Crohn's disease in the country in 1995, which he submitted at the national conference of the Indian Society of Gastroenterology. he also led a team of doctors who first reported Recurrent Pyogenic Cholangites or Oriental Cholangiopathy in India.

Positions
 President – Indian Pancreas Club
 managing director, Lakeshore Hospital and Research Centre
 Medical Director and Chief – Digestive Disease Centre, Lakeshore Hospital and Research Centre
 Chairman – Healthcare sub-committee of the Confederation of Indian Industry (CII) – Kerala Chapter

Awards and recognitions
 Padma Shri – 2010
 Olympus-Mitra Endoscopy Award – Indian Society of Gastroneterology – 1994
 Dr. P. A. Alexander Memorial Oration Award – IMA Academy of Medical Specialities – 1999
 Dr. V. C. Mathew Roy Memorial Oration Award – Association of Physicians of India – 2001
 Outstanding Entrepreneurship Award – Kerala State Industrial Development Corporation (KSIDC) – 2011

Publications
Augustine has published a book on bowel diseases which serves as a reference book on the subject.
 

He has also published several scientific journals and has contributed chapters on pancreasis in medical text books.

See also

 Gastroenterology
 Crohn's disease
 Endoscopy

References

External links
Lakeshore Hospital
 Reference on Doctor's Cabin
 Reference on Doctors Kerala
 Interview on YouTube – Part 1
 Interview on YouTube – Part 2
 Lakeshore on YouTube

Living people
Recipients of the Padma Shri in medicine
Malayali people
Indian gastroenterologists
People from Ernakulam district
Indian medical administrators
Year of birth missing (living people)
20th-century Indian medical doctors
Medical doctors from Kerala